Jeison Steven Lucumí Mina (born 8 April 1995) is a Colombian professional footballer who plays for Colombian club América de Cali as a right winger.

Club career
Born in Cali, Lucumí started his career at hometown side Dépor FC, and made his first team debut on 2 August 2012, playing the last seven minutes of a 1–2 Categoría Primera B home loss against Atlético Bucaramanga. His first goal for the club came on 10 March of the following year, as he scored the winner in a 2–1 home success over Jaguares de Córdoba.

Ahead of the 2014 campaign, Lucumí moved to América de Cali, also in the second division. He helped the club achieve promotion to Categoría Primera A in 2016, being a regular starter, and made his debut in the top tier on 4 February 2017 by starting in a 0–0 home draw against Rionegro Águilas.

Lucumí scored his first goal in the Colombian first division on 19 February 2017, netting his team's second in a 3–0 away win against La Equidad. On 25 July of that year, after already scoring six goals for América, he agreed to a three-year contract with Atlético Nacional, for a fee of US$1.8 million; América also retained 30% of a future sale.

In June 2019, Lucumí moved abroad for the first time in his career, signing for Liga MX side Tigres UANL; Jarlan Barrera moved in the opposite direction. On 10 July, however, he was announced at fellow league team Querétaro.

On 15 September 2020, Lucumí joined La Liga newcomers Elche CF, reuniting with his former manager at Atlético Nacional, Jorge Almirón. On 1 February 2021, after just two league matches, he terminated his contract.

On February 18 2021, Lucumí returned to Colombia and signed with América de Cali.

Honours
América de Cali
Categoría Primera B: 2016

Atlético Nacional
Copa Colombia: 2018

References

External links

1995 births
Living people
Footballers from Cali
Colombian footballers
Association football wingers
Categoría Primera A players
Categoría Primera B players
Atlético F.C. footballers
América de Cali footballers
Atlético Nacional footballers
Liga MX players
Tigres UANL footballers
Querétaro F.C. footballers
La Liga players
Elche CF players
Colombia under-20 international footballers
Colombian expatriate footballers
Colombian expatriate sportspeople in Mexico
Colombian expatriate sportspeople in Spain
Expatriate footballers in Mexico
Expatriate footballers in Spain